Arkalyk Airport (also given as Arkalyk North)  is an airport in Kazakhstan located  north of Arkalyk. It is a small civilian airport built during the Soviet era, and has a sizeable asphalt apron and passenger terminal. The terminal building is in a state of disrepair, and may be completely disused, and the apron and runway are both poorly maintained. The facility is used by the Russian space agency to base and refuel helicopters used in the recovery of returning Soyuz missions. It may also see private use. At present there are no scheduled airlines serving the airport.

References

Airports built in the Soviet Union
Airports in Kazakhstan